Kristian Sbaragli (born 8 May 1990) is an Italian racing cyclist, who currently rides for UCI ProTeam . He rode in the 2014 Vuelta a España and was named in the start list for the 2016 Giro d'Italia.

Major results

2008
 7th Overall Giro della Lunigiana
2011
 5th Gran Premio della Liberazione
 5th Gran Premio Industrie del Marmo
2012
 1st Trofeo Edil C
 1st Trofeo Gianfranco Bianchin
 2nd Gran Premio Industrie del Marmo
 3rd Road race, National Under-23 Road Championships
 3rd Ronde van Vlaanderen Beloften
 3rd Gran Premio di Poggiana
 4th Gran Premio della Liberazione
 10th GP Capodarco
2013
 5th Memorial Marco Pantani
 5th Le Samyn
 7th Ronde van Zeeland Seaports
 10th Overall Tour de Korea
1st Stages 1 & 5 (TTT)
2014
 2nd Gran Premio Industria e Commercio di Prato
 4th Tour du Finistère
 5th Le Samyn
 7th Paris–Tours
 10th Grand Prix de Denain
 10th Grand Prix Pino Cerami
 10th Trofeo Ses Salines
2015
 1st Stage 10 Vuelta a España
 4th Memorial Marco Pantani
 5th Grand Prix of Aargau Canton
 5th RideLondon–Surrey Classic
 6th Tre Valli Varesine
 7th Paris–Camembert
 8th Kuurne–Brussels–Kuurne
 8th Gran Piemonte
 9th Overall Tour de Luxembourg
 10th Overall Tour des Fjords
 10th Trofeo Playa de Palma
2016
 4th Grand Prix of Aargau Canton
 4th Rund um Köln
 8th Gran Premio Bruno Beghelli
 9th Coppa Sabatini
 9th Paris–Bourges
 10th Tre Valli Varesine
2018
 2nd Gran Premio di Lugano
 4th Trofeo Matteotti
 8th Overall Czech Cycling Tour
 10th Grand Prix de Fourmies
 10th Gran Premio Bruno Beghelli
2019
 4th Coppa Sabatini
 5th Overall Tour du Limousin
 6th Grand Prix Cycliste de Montréal
 7th Tre Valli Varesine
 9th Gran Premio di Lugano
 9th Memorial Marco Pantani
2020
 5th Road race, National Road Championships
2021
 6th Memorial Marco Pantani
 6th Coppa Ugo Agostoni
 7th Amstel Gold Race
 8th Overall Tour of Britain

Grand Tour general classification results timeline

References

External links
 
 

1990 births
Living people
Italian male cyclists
People from Empoli
Italian Vuelta a España stage winners
Sportspeople from the Metropolitan City of Florence
Cyclists from Tuscany